San Francisco, officially the Municipality of San Francisco (Surigaonon: Lungsod nan San Francisco), is a 5th class municipality in the province of Surigao del Norte, Philippines. According to the 2020 census, it has a population of 15,347 people.

History
There has been many stories concerning the origin of the town but the most common is about the two lovers, Anao and Aon. Anao was a handsome, strong hunter who fell in love with Aon, the most beautiful woman and daughter of a powerful datu, who ruled the town, which was formerly a barangay. Anao and Aon vowed to be true to their love, despite the datu's objection. The datu wanted to break their love, however, he failed since the lovers were found dead near the riverbank in cold embrace. Thus, the name Anao-aon in memory of the two lovers.

Anao-aon became a pueblo after the abolition of the encomienda system in the early part of the Spanish regime with Lorenzo Tremedal, a bonafide resident of Surigao, as the Kapitan del Pueblo.

During the Spanish–American War, the town was almost reduced to ashes hence, it was reverted into a barrio until the earlier part of 1957. Through the undying efforts of Martillano Diaz, father of Ex-Board Member Macario M. Diaz, Anao-aon was emancipated and regained its status as a municipality by virtue of Executive Order No. 249 on May 24, 1957, during the time of President Carlos P. Garcia. Macario M, Diaz was given the title of Father of the Municipality of Anao-aon. On August 15, 1957, the municipality was inaugurated.

During the time of Mayor Francisco Delani, through House Bill No. 1768, approved May 20, 1971 by the House of the Senate,  its unique and indigenous name Anao-aon was changed into San Francisco in honor of the Patron Saint, Saint Francis Xavier only to find out that it was creating confusion because there are many municipalities in the Philippines already named after San Francisco, but then it's too late for its politician authors and supporters to make the move to revert into its original name of Anao-aon.

Geography

Barangays
San Francisco is politically subdivided into 11 barangays.
 Amontay
 Balite
 Banbanon
 Diaz
 Honrado
 Jubgan
 Linongganan
 Macopa
 Magtangale
 Oslao
 Poblacion

Climate

Demographics

Economy

References

External links
San Francisco Profile at PhilAtlas.com
  San Francisco Profile at the DTI Cities and Municipalities Competitive Index
[ Philippine Standard Geographic Code]
Philippine Census Information
Local Governance Performance Management System

Municipalities of Surigao del Norte